"Another One Down" is a song recorded and written by American singer-songwriter Richard Marx. It was released on July 1, 2019 by BMG Rights Management, from his twelfth studio album Limitless. The song was produced by his son Lucas Marx.

Music video
The music video was released on October 12, 2019. Pop Dose commented that the video "finds Marx found doing what Cher wished she could have done for ages, turn back time".

Chart performance
The song reached No. 14 on the Billboard Adult Contemporary chart, becoming his highest-peaking non-holiday hit on the chart since 1997.

Charts

Weekly charts

Year-end charts

References

2019 songs
2019 singles
Richard Marx songs
Songs written by Richard Marx